Javier Dopico Morales (born 22 May 1985) is a Spanish footballer who plays as a midfielder.

Club career
Born in Málaga, Andalusia, Dopico graduated from local Málaga CF's youth system, making his senior debut with their reserves in the 2002–03 season, in Segunda División B. On 21 June 2003 he made his first-team – and La Liga – debut, playing the last 17 minutes in a 0–1 away loss against RCD Mallorca; he continued to appear for the former the following years, with a loan to Mérida UD in between.

After being released by Málaga, Dopico competed in the third level and Tercera División, representing UD Ibiza-Eivissa, CD Alhaurino, CD Atlético Baleares, CD Ronda, UD San Pedro, La Roda CF and Alhaurín de la Torre CF.

References

External links

1985 births
Living people
Footballers from Málaga
Spanish footballers
Association football midfielders
La Liga players
Segunda División players
Segunda División B players
Tercera División players
Divisiones Regionales de Fútbol players
Atlético Malagueño players
Málaga CF players
Mérida UD footballers
CD Atlético Baleares footballers
CD Ronda players
La Roda CF players
Spain youth international footballers